The 2018 Corpus Christi mayoral election was held on November 6, 2018 and December 18, 2018 to elect the mayor of Corpus Christi, Texas. The general election, held on November 6, 2018 did not produce a winner (elections for the mayoralty of Corpus Christi require a majority), therefore a runoff was required and held on December 18, 2018. The runoff election resulted in the re-election of Joe McComb, this time for a full two-year term.

Results

First round

Runoff

References 

Corpus Christi
Corpus Christi
Mayoral elections in Corpus Christi, Texas
Non-partisan elections